C. Richard Wells is an American evangelical pastor, theologian, and college president.

Wells was a member of the founding faculty of Beeson Divinity School, where he taught Ancient Greek, former President of Criswell College (1996-2003), Pastor of South Canyon Baptist Church in Rapid City, South Dakota, from 2004–2009, and Dean of Chapel at Union University in Jackson, Tennessee from 2009 through 2011.

In 2011 Wells returned to Rapid City, South Dakota to restructure the Black Hills Bible Institute into John Witherspoon College and Institute for Christian Leadership, where he was President, until replaced by Ronald Lewis in 2019.

Bibliography
Forgotten Songs, co-edited with Ray Van Neste, (B&H Publishing Group, 2012)
Inspired Preaching; Inspired Preaching: A Survey of  Preaching Found in the New Testament, co-edited with A. Boyd Luter  (B&H Publishing Group, 2002)
Perception and Faith: The Integration of Gestalt Psychology and Christian Theology in the Thought of C. S. Lewis, PhD dissertation, Baylor University, 1985

References

Baptist ministers from the United States
Heads of universities and colleges in the United States
Place of birth missing (living people)
Year of birth missing (living people)
Living people
Samford University faculty